The men's triple jump event at the 1978 Commonwealth Games was held on 11 and 12 August at the Commonwealth Stadium in Edmonton, Alberta, Canada.

Medalists

Results

Qualification
Held on 11 August

Qualification: 15.50 m (Q) or at least 12 best (q) qualified for the final.

Final
Held on 12 August

References

Final results (The Canberra Times)
Australian results

Athletics at the 1978 Commonwealth Games
1978